Barra Grant (born Barbara Carol Wayne) is an American actress, screenwriter, film director and playwright.

Biography
Grant was born Barbara Carol Wayne in New York City, the daughter of Allan Wayne, a doll company executive, and Bess Myerson, Miss America 1945. Her parents divorced in 1958 due to her father's abuse. She became Barra Grant when her mother married Arnold Grant and he adopted her in 1962. She was educated at the Birch Wathen Lenox School, Bryn Mawr College, and Barnard College. She also went to London for three years to study acting.

Grant began an acting career in the early 1970s, appearing on television and in film. One of her first roles was as Lulie in the BBC series Take Three Girls. While acting at The Mark Taper she was inspired to start writing. In 1978, she wrote and appeared in the film Slow Dancing in the Big City. She began her directing career with an episode of NBC Special Treat titled "The Tap Dance Kid", based on a novel by Louise Fitzhugh.

Grant was married to writer and producer Brian Reilly until his death in 2011.

Filmography

Film

Television

Other work

Bibliography

Stage plays
 A Mother, a Daughter and a Gun (2006).
 Miss America's Ugly Daughter, about her relationship to her mother, first performed on July 14, 2018, at The Edye, Santa Monica, California.

References

External links
 
 
 
 
Barra Grant with the Rebbe https://www.chabad.org/1974202

American television actresses
Film producers from New York (state)
American film actresses
Screenwriters from New York (state)
American film editors
Actresses from New York City
Writers from New York City
Living people
American people of Russian-Jewish descent
American women film producers
Jewish American actresses
American women film editors
Birch Wathen Lenox School alumni
Bryn Mawr College alumni
Barnard College alumni
21st-century American Jews
21st-century American women
Year of birth missing (living people)